Robert Barclay (1648–1690) was a Scottish Quaker writer and theologian.

Robert Barclay may also refer to:
 Sir Robert Barclay, 8th Baronet (1755–1839), MP for Newtown, Isle of Wight 1802–1807
 Robert Barclay (lieutenant-colonel) (1774–1811), officer in the British Army
 Robert Heriot Barclay (1786–1837), Scottish officer in the Royal Navy
 Robert Barclay (historiographer) (1833–1876), English ecclesiastical historiographer
 Sir Robert Noton Barclay (1872–1957), English export shipping merchant, banker and Liberal Party politician
 Robert Barclay (statistician) (1901–1973), Scottish statistician and scholar of Orkney
 Bobby Barclay (1906–1969), English footballer

See also
Robert Berkeley (disambiguation)
 Robert Barclay Allardice (1779–1854), aka Robert Barclay, Scottish sportsman considered one of the founding fathers of pedestrianism
 Robert Barclay Fox (1873–1934), Cornish businessman
 Robert Barclay Academy
 Barclay baronets
 Barclay (surname)